Dom Charles Norris OSB (1909-2004) was an influential artist who created works in stained glass and dalle de verre for Roman Catholic churches in the UK. He is thought to be the most prolific artist working in dalle de verre in the UK in the 20th century. His contributions to listed Modernist buildings are an integral part of their value and are mentioned in their listings.

Life and work

Dom Charles Norris (1909-2004) was a Benedictine monk and glass artist He was born Louis Charles Norris and he studied at the Royal College of Art in the 1920s. He entered Buckfast Abbey in 1930 as the age of 21 and began to work as a stained glass artist in 1933. He supervised a team of monks to rebuild the abbey, including the east window in dalle de verre in the Blessed Sacrament Chapel. 
Pierre Fourmaintraux is said to have brought the dalle de verre technique to Britain before joining James Powell and Sons (later Whitefriars Glass Studio) in 1956. He trained Dom Charles Norris in the technique, with Norris becoming one of the most prolific British proponents. Norris's design of the east window is mentioned in the List Entry Summary for Buckfast Abbey on the Historic England site.

In addition to his work in the workshops of Buckfast Abbey, Dom Charles Norris also had an association with the workshop at Prinknash Abbey and with Aylesford Priory in Kent.

Dom Charles Norris completed windows for a large number of churches including those at Perranporth Our Lady's, Lillington and Our Lady of Fatima, Harlow.  

A review by the Diocese of Plymouth and English Heritage notes: "The latter Waldo Maitland’s Our Lady of the Portal and St Piran, Truro (1973) is one of a large number of churches in the Diocese with stained glass designed and made under the supervision of Dom Charles Norris at Buckfast Abbey (an early example at Falmouth, dating from 1948, is illustrated on the front cover)."

Works

Buckfast Abbey

Buckfast Abbey credits Dom Charles with the following artworks, noting: "In 1968 Dom Charles completed his most striking embellishment of the church  the huge east window in the Blessed Sacrament Chapel. This employs the technique known as dalles-de-verre in which ‘tiles’ of coloured glass are chipped into shape and laid, mosaic-fashion, in a matrix of resin. Following this work, windows were made at Buckfast for many churches throughout the country."

Painted the lantern tower ceiling in egg-tempera (1939).
Designed the marble pavement in the choir (1949).
Laid the floor in the Lady Chapel (1958).
Stained glass window at Buckfast Abbey (1965).
East window in the Blessed Sacrament Chapel (1968).

A review by the Diocese of Plymouth and English Heritage notes: "Norris’s finest work is at Buckfast itself, where his glass of 1965 floods the newly-built Lady Chapel with warm red and blue glows".

Work on listed buildings

Many of the listings of notable 20th century churches include references to the importance of Dom Charles Norris's work. He collaborated on several listed churches with notable 20th century architect Gerard Goalen and artist Steven Sykes.

St Gregory the Great, South Ruislip - Grade II listed

Designed by Gerard Goalen in 1965, Historic England gives as a reason for its designation 'artistic interest', saying: "reflective of a culture of sacred art within the Catholic Church, and Goalen’s interest in the use of contemporary art in combination with architecture, St Gregory’s contains several notable works of art by a number of highly regarded C20 artists, including Patrick Reyntiens, Steven Sykes, Dom Charles Norris and Willi Soukup".

Church of Our Lady Lillington - Grade II listed

A Roman Catholic church, built in 1963, by Henry Fedeski ARIBA, with extensive dalle-de-verre glass by Dom Charles Norris OSB of Buckfast Abbey, and mosaic by Steven Sykes. Historic England cites the Church's artistic embellishment as one of the reasons for its designation. "The glory of the church is the extensive scheme of brightly-coloured dalle-de-verre glass designed by Dom Charles Norris of Buckfast Abbey, which fills the walls entirely at clerestory level, and is used for all the ground-floor glazing; it is complemented by mosaic work by Steven Sykes, who had also worked at Coventry Cathedral." Although designed by Norris, the glass itself was made at Prinknash Abbey.

Church of Our Lady Fatima, Harlow - Grade II listed

A Roman Catholic church designed 1953-4 by Gerard Goalen and built 1958–60. Its listing by Historic England says: "The chief decorative feature is the slab and fused slab glass set in concrete, designed and made by Dom Charles Norris OSB of Buckfast Abbey, assisted by Paulinus Angold and Jerome Gladman...[the church] was the first to combine this [liturgically-planned features] with modern glass, already so popular in France, Germany and Switzerland, where Goalen had travelled extensively."

Marychurch, Hatfield - Grade II listed

A Roman Catholic church designed in 1970 by George Mathers. Historic England cites the glasswork as one of the reasons for the church's listing: "The church is embellished by highly accomplished pieces of art work: these include the extensive scheme of dalle de verre glass by Dom Charles Norris and Dom Paulinus Angold, as well as the welded steel screen and font by Angela Godfrey".

The listing goes on to elaborate on Norris's contribution: "The windows in Marychurch were designed by Dom Charles Norris (d.2004), a Benedictine monk and artist, trained at the Royal College of Art, who with Dom Paulinas Angold (d.2010) had been responsible for the creation and construction of the coloured glass at Buckfast Abbey Church (Grade II*), where they developed the technique to create lighter windows using Epoxy Resin and sand instead of concrete."

The Parish Church of St John The Evangelist, Exmouth - Grade II listed

This church was reordered in 1964 and at that time a dalle-de-verre screen by Dom Charles Norris was added. Historic England highlights the screen in its listing noting how Dom Charles Norris's work in this material "became well-known and influential".

Church of the Holy Redeemer, St Wulstan and St Eadburga, Pershore - Grade II listed

A Roman Catholic church designed by Scottish architect Hugh Bankart ARIBA, FRIBA in 1958–59, which includes a three-light dalle-de-verre west window by Dom Charles Norris.

Shrine of Our Lady of Mount Carmel and St Simon Stock, Aylesford - Grade II* listed

The Roman Catholic Shrine was designed by Adrian Gilbert Scott. It contains works by a large number of notable artists including (in the Relic Chapel) "four pairs of semi-abstract dalle de verre windows made by Dom Charles Norris from Kossowski’s designs". Norris also contributed the windows in the exedra chapels.

Church of St Bernadette, Belfast - Grade B+ listed

A fan-shaped Roman Catholic church capable of seating over 1000 people which was designed by Brian Gregory and opened in 1967. It contains many works of modern art, most notably a nine-foot-high Crucifixion sculpture by Elisabeth Frink.  Dom Charles Norris' dalle-de-verre windows form the whole of the curved façade of the building.

Other churches 

Norris created works in dalle de verre and stained glass for Roman Catholic churches around the UK including: 
St Paul the Apostle (Tintagel, Cornwall), Church of St Winefride (Welshpool, Powys), Church of the Good Shepherd (Nottingham), St Mary (Barnstaple), Our Lady of Victories (Callington), Christ the King (Perranporth, Cornwall), Our Lady Star of the Sea (St Agnes, Cornwall), St Joseph (Shaw), St Margaret Mary (Plymstock), St Joseph (Accrington), Good Shepherd (New Addington), St Philip and St James (Herne Hill), Holy Rood (Swindon), St Theresa of Lisieux (Lexden), St Vincent de Paul (Rochdale), St Joseph (Blackburn), St Hugh of Lincoln (Manchester), English Martyrs (Sparkhill, Birmingham), Our Lady of Light (Long Crenden), St Bernadine of Siena (Buckingham), St Boniface (Crediton), St Joseph (Wroughton), Holy Redeemer, Our Lady of the Immaculate Conception (St Elmo's Road, London SE16), Our Lady of the Portal and St Piran (Truro), St Mary Immaculate (Falmouth), St Joseph (Weston Super Mare), Sacred Heart and St Ia (St Ives), St Mary (Alton), Christ the King (Milnthorpe), St Patrick (Jersey), 
Sacred Heart (Westbury-on-Trym), Christ the King (Burwash), Saint Bernard (Knott End).

Books

 Buckfast Abbey, Burleigh (date?)
 Buckfast Abbey A Pictorial Survey, Buckfast Abbey Publications (1938)
 Buckfast Abbey Works of Art, Curwen Press (date?)

References

1909 births
2004 deaths
Alumni of the Royal College of Art
British stained glass artists and manufacturers
British Benedictines